The Associate Reformed Presbyterian Church in Pakistan is a Protestant denomination in Pakistan that forms part of the Associate Reformed Presbyterian Church.

History 
The Associate Reformed Presbyterian Church had its beginnings in the 17th century, whereas the Associate Reformed Presbyterian Church in Pakistan was founded in 1911.
The Church of Pakistan and the Presbyterian Church of Pakistan are among the other Christian denominations. The Associate Reformed Presbyterian Church of Pakistan has as membership of around 150,000.

The centennial celebration of the church was held in Karachi where more than 5,000 ARP members were present. The beginning of the church was in 1906. Under British rule doctor Minnie Alexander came to Montgomery to extend medical assistance to the poor. Dr Minnie started mission work by working at a small clinic in Sialkot. Alexanders tenacity draw many more missionaries to Pakistan and now the denomination has more than 110,000 members. Dr. Ranson come to Pakistan with his family in 1920.

Dr Minnie's small clinic became a 160-bed hospital.
The church established the School of Nursingin Sahiwal in 1948. The denomination has several Christian schools in Pakistan. The ARP mission has planted 100 churches in Pakistan, 28 of which have planted in Karachi.

Theological education 
The Gujranwala Theological Seminary serves the Associate Reformed Presbyterian Church in Pakistan, the Presbyterian Church of Pakistan and the Church of Pakistan to train pastors and ministers.

Doctrine 
The Church motto says: "Whoever believes on HIM will not be put to shame".

Creeds 
Apostles Creed
Athanasian Creed
Nicene Creed

Confessions 
Westminster Confession of Faith (1647)
Westminster Shorter Catechism (1647)

See also 
Protestantism in Pakistan
Presbyterian Church of Pakistan

External links 
Facebook site: 
 Presbyterian Hospital in Pakistan

References 

Protestantism in Pakistan
Presbyterian denominations in Asia
Evangelical denominations in Asia
Associate Reformed Presbyterian Church